The Fourth Menzies ministry (Liberal–Country Coalition) was the 34th ministry of the Government of Australia. It was led by the country's 12th Prime Minister, Robert Menzies. The Fourth Menzies ministry succeeded the Second Chifley ministry, which dissolved on 19 December 1949 following the federal election that took place on 10 December which saw the Coalition defeat Ben Chifley's Labor Party. The ministry was replaced by the Fifth Menzies ministry on 11 May 1951 following the 1951 federal election.

Percy Spender, who died in 1985, was the last surviving member of the Fourth Menzies Ministry; Spender was also the last surviving minister of the first Menzies Government and the Fadden Government. John McEwen was the last surviving Country minister.

Ministry

Notes

Ministries of George VI
Menzies, 04
1949 establishments in Australia
1951 disestablishments in Australia
Robert Menzies
Cabinets established in 1949
Cabinets disestablished in 1951